Conceptual art, also referred to as conceptualism, is art in which the concept(s) or idea(s) involved in the work take precedence over traditional aesthetic, technical, and material concerns. Some works of conceptual art, sometimes called installations, may be constructed by anyone simply by following a set of written instructions. This method was fundamental to American artist Sol LeWitt's definition of conceptual art, one of the first to appear in print:

Tony Godfrey, author of Conceptual Art (Art & Ideas) (1998), asserts that conceptual art questions the nature of art, a notion that Joseph Kosuth elevated to a definition of art itself in his seminal, early manifesto of conceptual art, Art after Philosophy (1969). The notion that art should examine its own nature was already a potent aspect of the influential art critic Clement Greenberg's vision of Modern art during the 1950s. With the emergence of an exclusively language-based art in the 1960s, however, conceptual artists such as Art & Language, Joseph Kosuth (who became the American editor of Art-Language), and Lawrence Weiner began a far more radical interrogation of art than was previously possible (see below). One of the first and most important things they questioned was the common assumption that the role of the artist was to create special kinds of material objects.
 
Through its association with the Young British Artists and the Turner Prize during the 1990s, in popular usage, particularly in the United Kingdom, "conceptual art" came to denote all contemporary art that does not practice the traditional skills of painting and sculpture. One of the reasons why the term "conceptual art" has come to be associated with various contemporary practices far removed from its original aims and forms lies in the problem of defining the term itself. As the artist Mel Bochner suggested as early as 1970, in explaining why he does not like the epithet "conceptual", it is not always entirely clear what "concept" refers to, and it runs the risk of being confused with "intention". Thus, in describing or defining a work of art as conceptual it is important not to confuse what is referred to as "conceptual" with an artist's "intention".

Precursors

The French artist Marcel Duchamp paved the way for the conceptualists, providing them with examples of prototypically conceptual works — the readymades, for instance. The most famous of Duchamp's readymades was Fountain (1917), a standard urinal-basin signed by the artist with the pseudonym "R.Mutt", and submitted for inclusion in the annual, un-juried exhibition of the Society of Independent Artists in New York (which rejected it). The artistic tradition does not see a commonplace object (such as a urinal) as art because it is not made by an artist or with any intention of being art, nor is it unique or hand-crafted. Duchamp's relevance and theoretical importance for future "conceptualists" was later acknowledged by US artist Joseph Kosuth in his 1969 essay, Art after Philosophy, when he wrote: "All art (after Duchamp) is conceptual (in nature) because art only exists conceptually".

In 1956 the founder of Lettrism, Isidore Isou, developed the notion of a work of art which, by its very nature, could never be created in reality, but which could nevertheless provide aesthetic rewards by being contemplated intellectually. This concept, also called Art esthapériste (or "infinite-aesthetics"), derived from the infinitesimals of Gottfried Wilhelm Leibniz – quantities which could not actually exist except conceptually. The current incarnation of the Isouian movement, Excoördism, self-defines as the art of the infinitely large and the infinitely small.

Origins
In 1961, philosopher and artist Henry Flynt coined the term "concept art" in an article bearing the same name which appeared in the proto-Fluxus publication An Anthology of Chance Operations. Flynt's concept art, he maintained, devolved from his notion of "cognitive nihilism", in which paradoxes in logic are shown to evacuate concepts of substance. Drawing on the syntax of logic and mathematics, concept art was meant jointly to supersede mathematics and the formalistic music then current in serious art music circles. Therefore, Flynt maintained, to merit the label concept art, a work had to be a critique of logic or mathematics in which a linguistic concept was the material, a quality which is absent from subsequent "conceptual art".

The term assumed a different meaning when employed by Joseph Kosuth and by the English Art and Language group, who discarded the conventional art object in favour of a documented critical inquiry, that began in Art-Language: The Journal of Conceptual Art in 1969, into the artist's social, philosophical, and psychological status. By the mid-1970s they had produced publications, indices, performances, texts and paintings to this end. In 1970 Conceptual Art and Conceptual Aspects, the first dedicated conceptual-art exhibition, took place at the New York Cultural Center.

The critique of formalism and of the commodification of art
Conceptual art emerged as a movement during the 1960s – in part as a reaction against formalism as then articulated by the influential New York art critic Clement Greenberg. According to Greenberg Modern art followed a process of progressive reduction and refinement toward the goal of defining the essential, formal nature of each medium. Those elements that ran counter to this nature were to be reduced. The task of painting, for example, was to define precisely what kind of object a painting truly is: what makes it a painting and nothing else. As it is of the nature of paintings to be flat objects with canvas surfaces onto which colored pigment is applied, such things as figuration, 3-D perspective illusion and references to external subject matter were all found to be extraneous to the essence of painting, and ought to be removed.

Some have argued that conceptual art continued this "dematerialization" of art by removing the need for objects altogether,
while others, including many of the artists themselves, saw conceptual art as a radical break with Greenberg's kind of formalist Modernism. Later artists continued to share a preference for art to be self-critical, as well as a distaste for illusion. However, by the end of the 1960s it was certainly clear that Greenberg's stipulations for art to continue within the confines of each medium and to exclude external subject matter no longer held traction.
Conceptual art also reacted against the commodification of art; it attempted a subversion of the gallery or museum as the location and determiner of art, and the art market as the owner and distributor of art. Lawrence Weiner said: "Once you know about a work of mine you own it. There's no way I can climb inside somebody's head and remove it." Many conceptual artists' work can therefore only be known about through documentation which is manifested by it, e.g., photographs, written texts or displayed objects, which some might argue are not in and of themselves the art. It is sometimes (as in the work of Robert Barry, Yoko Ono, and Weiner himself) reduced to a set of written instructions describing a work, but stopping short of actually making it—emphasising the idea as more important than the artifact. This reveals an explicit preference for the "art" side of the ostensible dichotomy between art and craft, where art, unlike craft, takes place within and engages historical discourse: for example, Ono's "written instructions" make more sense alongside other conceptual art of the time.

Language and/as art
Language was a central concern for the first wave of conceptual artists of the 1960s and early 1970s. Although the utilisation of text in art was in no way novel, only in the 1960s did the artists Lawrence Weiner, Edward Ruscha, Joseph Kosuth, Robert Barry, and Art & Language begin to produce art by exclusively linguistic means. Where previously language was presented as one kind of visual element alongside others, and subordinate to an overarching composition (e.g. Synthetic Cubism), the conceptual artists used language in place of brush and canvas, and allowed it to signify in its own right. Of Lawrence Weiner's works Anne Rorimer writes, "The thematic content of individual works derives solely from the import of the language employed, while presentational means and contextual placement play crucial, yet separate, roles."

The British philosopher and theorist of conceptual art Peter Osborne suggests that among the many factors that influenced the gravitation toward language-based art, a central role for conceptualism came from the turn to linguistic theories of meaning in both Anglo-American analytic philosophy, and structuralist and post structuralist Continental philosophy during the middle of the twentieth century. This linguistic turn "reinforced and legitimized" the direction the conceptual artists took. Osborne also notes that the early conceptualists were the first generation of artists to complete degree-based university training in art. Osborne later made the observation that contemporary art is post-conceptual in a public lecture delivered at the Fondazione Antonio Ratti, Villa Sucota in Como on July 9, 2010. It is a claim made at the level of the ontology of the work of art (rather than say at the descriptive level of style or movement).

The American art historian Edward A. Shanken points to the example of Roy Ascott who "powerfully demonstrates the significant intersections between conceptual art and art-and-technology, exploding the conventional autonomy of these art-historical categories." Ascott, the British artist most closely associated with cybernetic art in England, was not included in Cybernetic Serendipity because his use of cybernetics was primarily conceptual and did not explicitly utilize technology. Conversely, although his essay on the application of cybernetics to art and art pedagogy, "The Construction of Change" (1964), was quoted on the dedication page (to Sol LeWitt) of Lucy R. Lippard's seminal Six Years: The Dematerialization of the Art Object from 1966 to 1972, Ascott's anticipation of and contribution to the formation of conceptual art in Britain has received scant recognition, perhaps (and ironically) because his work was too closely allied with art-and-technology. Another vital intersection was explored in Ascott's use of the thesaurus in 1963 telematic connections:: timeline, which drew an explicit parallel between the taxonomic qualities of verbal and visual languages – a concept that would be taken up in Joseph Kosuth's Second Investigation, Proposition 1 (1968) and Mel Ramsden's Elements of an Incomplete Map (1968).

Conceptual art and artistic skill

By adopting language as their exclusive medium, Weiner, Barry, Wilson, Kosuth and Art & Language were able to sweep aside the vestiges of authorial presence manifested by formal invention and the handling of materials.

An important difference between conceptual art and more "traditional" forms of art-making goes to the question of artistic skill. Although skill in the handling of traditional media often plays little role in conceptual art, it is difficult to argue that no skill is required to make conceptual works, or that skill is always absent from them. John Baldessari, for instance, has presented realist pictures that he commissioned professional sign-writers to paint; and many conceptual performance artists (e.g. Stelarc, Marina Abramović) are technically accomplished performers and skilled manipulators of their own bodies. It is thus not so much an absence of skill or hostility toward tradition that defines conceptual art as an evident disregard for conventional, modern notions of authorial presence and of individual artistic expression.

Contemporary influence
Proto-conceptualism has roots in the rise of Modernism with, for example, Manet (1832–1883) and later Marcel Duchamp (1887–1968). The first wave of the "conceptual art" movement extended from approximately 1967
to 1978. Early "concept" artists like Henry Flynt (1940– ), Robert Morris (1931–2018), and Ray Johnson (1927–1995) influenced the later, widely accepted movement of conceptual art. Conceptual artists like Dan Graham, Hans Haacke, and Lawrence Weiner have proven very influential on subsequent artists, and well-known contemporary artists such as Mike Kelley or Tracey Emin are sometimes labeled "second- or third-generation" conceptualists, or "post-conceptual" artists (the prefix Post- in art can frequently be interpreted as "because of").

Contemporary artists have taken up many of the concerns of the conceptual art movement, while they may or may not term themselves "conceptual artists". Ideas such as anti-commodification, social and/or political critique, and ideas/information as medium continue to be aspects of contemporary art, especially among artists working with installation art, performance art, art intervention, net.art, and electronic/digital art.

Notable examples

 1913 : Bicycle Wheel (Roue de bicyclette) by Marcel Duchamp. Assisted readymade. Bicycle wheel mounted by its fork on a painted wooden stool. The first readymade, even though he did not have the idea for readymades until two years later. The original was lost. Also, recognized as the first kinetic sculpture. 
 1914 : Pharmacy (Pharmacie) by Marcel Duchamp. Rectified readymade. Gouache on chromolithograph of a scene with bare trees and a winding stream to which he added two circles, red and green.
 1914 : Bottle Rack (also called Bottle Dryer or Hedgehog) (Egouttoir or Porte-bouteilles or Hérisson) by Marcel Duchamp. Readymade. A galvanized iron bottle drying rack that Duchamp bought as an "already made" sculpture, but it gathered dust in the corner of his Paris studio. Two years later in 1916, in correspondence from New York with his sister, Suzanne Duchamp in France, he expresses a desire to make it a readymade. Suzanne, looking after his Paris studio, has already disposed of it.
 1915 : In Advance of the Broken Arm (En prévision du bras cassé) by Marcel Duchamp. Readymade. Snow shovel on which Duchamp carefully painted its title. The first piece the artist officially called a "readymade". 
 1915 : Pulled at 4 pins by Marcel Duchamp. Readymade. An unpainted chimney ventilator that turns in the wind. Duchamp liked that the literal translation meant nothing in English and had no relation to the object.
 1916 : With Hidden Noise (A bruit secret) by Marcel Duchamp.  Assisted readymade. A ball of twine between two brass plates, joined by four screws. An unknown object has been placed in the ball of twine by Duchamp's friend, Walter Arensberg.
 1916 : Comb (Peigne) by Marcel Duchamp. Readymade. Steel dog grooming comb inscribed along the edge.
 1917 : Traveller's Folding Item (...pliant,... de voyage) by Marcel Duchamp. Readymade. Underwood Typewriter cover. 
 1916–17 : Apolinère Enameled, 1916–1917. Rectified readymade. An altered Sapolin paint advertisement.
 1917 : Fountain by Marcel Duchamp, described in an article in The Independent as the invention of conceptual art. It is also an early example of an Institutional Critique
 1917 : 'Trap (Trébuchet) by Marcel Duchamp. Readymade. Wood and metal coatrack attached to floor.
 1917 : Hat Rack (Porte-chapeaux), c. 1917, by Marcel Duchamp. Readymade. A wooden hatrack.
 1919 : L.H.O.O.Q. by Marcel Duchamp. Rectified readymade. Pencil on a reproduction of Leonardo da Vinci's Mona Lisa on which he drew a goatee and moustache titled with a coarse pun.
 1919 : Unhappy readymade, by Marcel Duchamp. Assisted readymade. Duchamp instructed his sister Suzanne to hang a geometry textbook from the balcony of her Paris apartment. Suzanne carried out the instructions and painted a picture of the result.
 1919 : 50 cc of Paris Air (50 cc air de Paris, Paris Air or Air de Paris) by Marcel Duchamp. Readymade. A glass ampoule containing air from Paris. Duchamp took the ampoule to New York City in 1920 and gave it to Walter Arensberg as a gift.
 1920 : Fresh Widow by Marcel Duchamp. Readymade. An altered French window creating a pun.
 1921 : Why Not Sneeze, Rose Sélavy? by Marcel Duchamp. Assisted readymade. Marble cubes in the shape of sugar lumps with a thermometer and cuttle bones in a small bird cage.
 1921 : Belle Haleine, Eau de Voilette by Marcel Duchamp. Assisted readymade. An altered perfume bottle in the original box.
 1921 : The Brawl at Austerlitz by Marcel Duchamp. Readymade. Like Fresh Widow, made by a carpenter according to Duchamp's specifications.
 1923 : Wanted, $2,000 Reward by Marcel Duchamp. Rectified readymade. Photographic collage on poster.
 1952 : The premiere of American experimental composer John Cage's work, 4′33″, a three-movement composition, performed by pianist David Tudor on August 29, 1952, in Maverick Concert Hall, Woodstock, New York, as part of a recital of contemporary piano music. It is commonly perceived as "four minutes thirty-three seconds of silence".
 1953 : Robert Rauschenberg produces Erased De Kooning Drawing, a drawing by Willem de Kooning which Rauschenberg erased. It raised many questions about the fundamental nature of art, challenging the viewer to consider whether erasing another artist's work could be a creative act, as well as whether the work was only "art" because the famous Rauschenberg had done it.
 1955 : Rhea Sue Sanders creates her first text pieces of the series pièces de complices, combining visual art with poetry and philosophy, and introducing the concept of complicity: the viewer must accomplish the art in her/his imagination.
 1956 : Isidore Isou introduces the concept of infinitesimal art in Introduction à une esthétique imaginaire (Introduction to Imaginary Aesthetics).
 1957: Yves Klein, Aerostatic Sculpture (Paris), composed of 1001 blue balloons released into the sky from Galerie Iris Clert to promote his Proposition Monochrome; Blue Epoch exhibition. Klein also exhibited One Minute Fire Painting, which was a blue panel into which 16 firecrackers were set. For his next major exhibition, The Void in 1958, Klein declared that his paintings were now invisible – and to prove it he exhibited an empty room.
 1958: George Brecht invents the Event Score which would become a central feature of Fluxus. Brecht, Dick Higgins, Allan Kaprow, Al Hansen, Jackson MacLow and others studied with John Cage between 1958 and 1959 at the New School leading directly to the creation of Happenings, Fluxus and Henry Flynt's concept art. Event Scores are simple instructions to complete everyday tasks which can be performed publicly, privately, or not at all.
 1958: Wolf Vostell Das Theater ist auf der Straße/The theater is on the street. The first Happening in Europe.
 1960: Yves Klein's action called A Leap Into The Void, in which he attempts to fly by leaping out of a window. He stated: "The painter has only to create one masterpiece, himself, constantly."
 1960: The artist Stanley Brouwn declares that all the shoe shops in Amsterdam constitute an exhibition of his work.
 1961: Wolf Vostell Cityrama, in Cologne – the first Happening in Germany.
 1961: Robert Rauschenberg sent a telegram to the Galerie Iris Clert which read: 'This is a portrait of Iris Clert if I say so.' as his contribution to an exhibition of portraits.
 1961: Piero Manzoni exhibited Artist's Shit, tins purportedly containing his own feces (although since the work would be destroyed if opened, no one has been able to say for sure). He put the tins on sale for their own weight in gold. He also sold his own breath (enclosed in balloons) as Bodies of Air, and signed people's bodies, thus declaring them to be living works of art either for all time or for specified periods. (This depended on how much they are prepared to pay). Marcel Broodthaers and Primo Levi are amongst the designated "artworks".
 1962: Artist Barrie Bates rebrands himself as Billy Apple, erasing his original identity to continue his exploration of everyday life and commerce as art. By this stage, many of his works are fabricated by third parties.
 1962: Christo's Iron Curtain work. This consists of a barricade of oil barrels in a narrow Paris street which caused a large traffic jam. The artwork was not the barricade itself but the resulting traffic jam.
 1962: Yves Klein presents Immaterial Pictorial Sensitivity in various ceremonies on the banks of the Seine. He offers to sell his own "pictorial sensitivity" (whatever that was – he did not define it) in exchange for gold leaf. In these ceremonies the purchaser gave Klein the gold leaf in return for a certificate. Since Klein's sensitivity was immaterial, the purchaser was then required to burn the certificate whilst Klein threw half the gold leaf into the Seine. (There were seven purchasers.)
 1962: Piero Manzoni created The Base of the World, thereby exhibiting the entire planet as his artwork.
 1962: Alberto Greco began his Vivo Dito or Live Art series, which took place in Paris, Rome, Madrid, and Piedralaves. In each artwork, Greco called attention to the art in everyday life, thereby asserting that art was actually a process of looking and seeing. 
 1962: FLUXUS Internationale Festspiele Neuester Musik in Wiesbaden with George Maciunas, Wolf Vostell, Nam June Paik and others.
 1963: George Brecht's collection of Event-Scores, Water Yam, is published as the first Fluxkit by George Maciunas. 
 1963: Festum Fluxorum Fluxus in Düsseldorf with George Maciunas, Wolf Vostell, Joseph Beuys, Dick Higgins, Nam June Paik, Ben Patterson, Emmett Williams and others.
 1963: Henry Flynt's article Concept Art is published in An Anthology of Chance Operations; a collection of artworks and concepts by artists and musicians that was published by Jackson Mac Low and La Monte Young (ed.). An Anthology of Chance Operations documented the development of Dick Higgins’s vision of intermedia art in the context of the ideas of John Cage, and became an early pre-Fluxus masterpiece. Flynt's "concept art" devolved from his idea of "cognitive nihilism" and from his insights about the vulnerabilities of logic and mathematics.
 1964: Yoko Ono publishes Grapefruit: A Book of Instructions and Drawings, an example of heuristic art, or a series of instructions for how to obtain an aesthetic experience.
 1965: Art & Language founder Michael Baldwin's Mirror Piece. Instead of paintings, the work shows a variable number of mirrors that challenge both the visitor and Clement Greenberg’s theory.
 1965: A complex conceptual art piece by John Latham called Still and Chew. He invites art students to protest against the values of Clement Greenberg's Art and Culture, much praised and taught at Saint Martin's School of Art in London, where Latham taught part-time. Pages of Greenberg's book (borrowed from the college library) are chewed by the students, dissolved in acid and the resulting solution returned to the library bottled and labelled. Latham was then fired from his part-time position.
 1965: with Show V, immaterial sculpture the Dutch artist Marinus Boezem introduced conceptual art in the Netherlands. In the show, various air doors are placed where people can walk through them. People have the sensory experience of warmth, air. Three invisible air doors, which arise as currents of cold and warm are blown into the room, are indicated in the space with bundles of arrows and lines. The articulation of the space that arises is the result of invisible processes which influence the conduct of persons in that space, and who are included in the system as co-performers.
 Joseph Kosuth dates the concept of One and Three Chairs to the year 1965. The presentation of the work consists of a chair, its photo, and an enlargement of a definition of the word "chair". Kosuth chose the definition from a dictionary. Four versions with different definitions are known.
 1966: Conceived in 1966 The Air Conditioning Show of Art & Language is published as an article in 1967 in the November issue of Arts Magazine.
 1966: N.E. Thing Co. Ltd. (Iain and Ingrid Baxter of Vancouver) exhibit Bagged Place, the contents of a four-room apartment wrapped in plastic bags. The same year they registered as a corporation and subsequently organized their practice along corporate models, one of the first international examples of the "aesthetic of administration".
 1967: Mel Ramsden’s first 100% Abstract Paintings. The painting shows a list of chemical components that constitutes the substance of the painting.
 1967: Sol LeWitt's Paragraphs on Conceptual Art were published by the American art journal Artforum. The Paragraphs mark the progression from Minimal to Conceptual Art.
 1968: Michael Baldwin, Terry Atkinson, David Bainbridge and Harold Hurrell found Art & Language.
 1968: Lawrence Weiner relinquishes the physical making of his work and formulates his "Declaration of Intent", one of the most important conceptual art statements following LeWitt's "Paragraphs on Conceptual Art". The declaration, which underscores his subsequent practice, reads: "1. The artist may construct the piece. 2. The piece may be fabricated. 3. The piece need not be built. Each being equal and consistent with the intent of the artist the decision as to condition rests with the receiver upon the occasion of receivership."
 Friedrich Heubach launches the magazine Interfunktionen in Cologne, Germany, a publication that excelled in artists' projects. It originally showed a Fluxus influence, but later moved toward conceptual art.
 1969: The first generation of New York alternative exhibition spaces are established, including Billy Apple's APPLE, Robert Newman's Gain Ground, where Vito Acconci produced many important early works, and 112 Greene Street.
 1969: Robert Barry's Telepathic Piece at Simon Fraser University, Vancouver, of which he said "During the exhibition I will try to communicate telepathically a work of art, the nature of which is a series of thoughts that are not applicable to language or image."
 1969: The first issue of Art-Language: The Journal of conceptual art is published in May, edited by Terry Atkinson, David Bainbridge, Michael Baldwin and Harold Hurrell. Art & Language are the editors of this first number, and by the second number Joseph Kosuth joins and serves as American editor until 1972.
 1969: Vito Acconci creates Following Piece, in which he follows randomly selected members of the public until they disappear into a private space. The piece is presented as photographs.
 The English journal Studio International publishes Joseph Kosuth´s article "Art after Philosophy" in three parts (October–December). It became the most discussed article on conceptual art.
 1970: Ian Burn, Mel Ramsden and Charles Harrison join Art & Language.
 1970: Painter John Baldessari exhibits a film in which he sets a series of erudite statements by Sol LeWitt on the subject of conceptual art to popular tunes like "Camptown Races" and "Some Enchanted Evening".
 1970: Douglas Huebler exhibits a series of photographs taken every two minutes while driving along a road for 24 minutes.
 1970: Douglas Huebler asks museum visitors to write down 'one authentic secret'. The resulting 1800 documents are compiled into a book which, by some accounts, makes for very repetitive reading as most secrets are similar.
 1971: Hans Haacke's Real Time Social System. This piece of systems art detailed the real estate holdings of the third largest landowners in New York City. The properties, mostly in Harlem and the Lower East Side, were decrepit and poorly maintained, and represented the largest concentration of real estate in those areas under the control of a single group. The captions gave various financial details about the buildings, including recent sales between companies owned or controlled by the same family. The Guggenheim museum cancelled the exhibition, stating that the overt political implications of the work constituted "an alien substance that had entered the art museum organism". There is no evidence to suggest that the trustees of the Guggenheim were linked financially to the family which was the subject of the work.
 1972: The Art & Language Institute exhibits Index 01 at the Documenta 5, an installation indexing text-works by Art & Language and text-works from Art-Language. 
 1972: Antonio Caro exhibits in the National Art Salon (Museo Nacional, Bogotá, Colombia) his work: Aquinocabeelarte (Art does not fit here), where each of the letters is a separate poster, and under each letter is written the name of some victim of state repression.
 1972: Fred Forest buys an area of blank space in the newspaper Le Monde and invites readers to fill it with their own works of art.
 General Idea launch File magazine in Toronto. The magazine functioned as something of an extended, collaborative artwork.
 1973: Jacek Tylicki lays out blank canvases or paper sheets in the natural environment for nature to create art.
 1974: Cadillac Ranch near Amarillo, Texas.
1975–76: Three issues of the journal The Fox were published by Art & Language in New York. The editor was Joseph Kosuth. The Fox became an important platform for the American members of Art & Language. Karl Beveridge, Ian Burn, Sarah Charlesworth, Michael Corris, Joseph Kosuth, Andrew Menard, Mel Ramsden and Terry Smith wrote articles which thematized the context of contemporary art. These articles exemplify the development of an institutional critique within the inner circle of conceptual art. The criticism of the art world integrates social, political and economic reasons.
 1975–77 Orshi Drozdik's Individual Mythology performance, photography and offsetprint series and her theory of ImageBank in Budapest.
 1976: facing internal problems, members of Art & Language separate. The destiny of the name Art & Language remains in Michael Baldwin, Mel Ramsden and Charles Harrison hands.
 1977: Walter De Maria's Vertical Earth Kilometer in Kassel, Germany. This was a one kilometer brass rod which was sunk into the earth so that nothing remained visible except a few centimeters. Despite its size, therefore, this work exists mostly in the viewer's mind.
 1982: The opera Victorine by Art & Language was to be performed in the city of Kassel for documenta 7 and shown alongside Art & Language Studio at 3 Wesley Place Painted by Actors, but the performance was cancelled.
 1986: Art & Language are nominated for the Turner Prize.
 1989: Christopher Williams' Angola to Vietnam is first exhibited. The work consists of a series of black-and-white photographs of glass botanical specimens from the Botanical Museum at Harvard University, chosen according to a list of the thirty-six countries in which political disappearances were known to have taken place during the year 1985.
 1990: Ashley Bickerton and Ronald Jones included in "Mind Over Matter: Concept and Object" exhibition of ”third generation Conceptual artists” at the Whitney Museum of American Art.
 1991: Ronald Jones exhibits objects and text, art, history and science rooted in grim political reality at Metro Pictures Gallery.
 1991: Charles Saatchi funds Damien Hirst and the next year in the Saatchi Gallery exhibits his The Physical Impossibility of Death in the Mind of Someone Living, a shark in formaldehyde in a vitrine.
 1992: Maurizio Bolognini starts to "seal" his Programmed Machines: hundreds of computers are programmed and left to run ad infinitum to generate inexhaustible flows of random images which nobody would see.
 1993: Matthieu Laurette established his artistic birth certificate by taking part in a French TV game called Tournez manège (The Dating Game) where the female presenter asked him who he was, to which he replied: 'A multimedia artist'. Laurette had sent out invitations to an art audience to view the show on TV from their homes, turning his staging of the artist into a performed reality.
 1993: Vanessa Beecroft holds her first performance in Milan, Italy, using models to act as a second audience to the display of her diary of food.
 1999: Tracey Emin is nominated for the Turner Prize. Part of her exhibit is My Bed, her dishevelled bed, surrounded by detritus such as condoms, blood-stained knickers, bottles and her bedroom slippers.
 2001: Martin Creed wins the Turner Prize for Work No. 227: The lights going on and off, an empty room in which the lights go on and off.
 2003: damali ayo exhibits at the Center of Contemporary Art, Seattle, WA Flesh Tone #1: Skinned, a collaborative self-portrait where she asked paint mixers from local hardware stores to create house paint to match various parts of her body, while recording the interactions.
 2004: Andrea Fraser's video Untitled, a document of her sexual encounter in a hotel room with a collector (the collector having agreed to help finance the technical costs for enacting and filming the encounter) is exhibited at the Friedrich Petzel Gallery. It is accompanied by her 1993 work Don't Postpone Joy, or Collecting Can Be Fun, a 27-page transcript of an interview with a collector in which the majority of the text has been deleted.
 2005: Simon Starling wins the Turner Prize for Shedboatshed, a wooden shed which he had turned into a boat, floated down the Rhine and turned back into a shed again.
 2005: Maurizio Nannucci creates the large neon installation All Art Has Been Contemporary on the facade of Altes Museum in Berlin.
 2014: Olaf Nicolai creates the Memorial for the Victims of Nazi Military Justice on Vienna's Ballhausplatz after winning an international competition. The inscription on top of the three-step sculpture features a poem by Scottish poet Ian Hamilton Finlay (1924–2006) with just two words: all alone.

Notable conceptual artists

 Kevin Abosch (born 1969)
 Vito Acconci (1940–2017)
 Bas Jan Ader (1942–1975)
 Vikky Alexander (born 1959)
 Francis Alÿs (born 1959)
 Keith Arnatt (1930–2008)
 Art & Language
 Roy Ascott (born 1934)
 Marina Abramović (born 1946)
 Billy Apple (born 1935)
 Shusaku Arakawa (1936–2010)
 Christopher D'Arcangelo (1955–1979)
 Michael Asher (1943–2012)
 Mireille Astore (born 1961)
 damali ayo (born 1972)
 Abel Azcona (born 1988)
 John Baldessari (1931–2020)
 Adina Bar-On (born 1951)
 NatHalie Braun Barends
 Artur Barrio (born 1945)
 Robert Barry (born 1936)
 Lothar Baumgarten (1944–2018)
 Joseph Beuys (1921–1986)
 Adolf Bierbrauer (1915–2012)
 Mark Bloch (born 1956)
 Mel Bochner (born 1940)
 Marinus Boezem (born 1934)
 Maurizio Bolognini (born 1952)
 Allan Bridge (1945–1995)
 Marcel Broodthaers (1924–1976)
 Chris Burden (1946–2015)
 María Teresa Burga Ruiz (1935–2021)
 Daniel Buren (born 1938)
 Victor Burgin (born 1941)
 Donald Burgy (born 1937)
 Maris Bustamante (born 1949)
 John Cage (1912–1992)
 Cai Guo-Qiang (born 1957)
 Sophie Calle (born 1953)
 Graciela Carnevale (born 1942)
 Roberto Chabet (1937–2013)
 Greg Colson (born 1956)
 Martin Creed (born 1968)
 Cory Danziger (born 1977)
 Jack Daws (born 1970)
 Jeremy Deller (born 1966)
 Agnes Denes (born 1938)
 Jan Dibbets (born 1941)
 Mark Divo (born 1966)
 Brad Downey (born 1980)
 Marcel Duchamp (1887–1968)
 Olafur Eliasson (born 1967)
 Noemí Escandell (1942–2019)
 Ken Feingold (born 1952)
 Teresita Fernández (born 1968)
 Fluxus
 Henry Flynt (born 1940)
 Andrea Fraser (born 1965)
 Jens Galschiøt (born 1954)
 Kendell Geers
 Thierry Geoffroy (born 1961)
 Jochen Gerz (born 1940)
 Gilbert and George Gilbert (born 1943) George (born 1942)
 Manav Gupta (born 1967)
 Felix Gonzalez-Torres (1957–1996)
 Allan Graham (1943–2019)
 Dan Graham (1942-2022)
 Genco Gulan (born 1969)
 Hans Haacke (born 1936)
 Iris Häussler (born 1962)
 Irma Hünerfauth (1907–1998)
 Oliver Herring (born 1964)
 Andreas Heusser (born 1976)
 Susan Hiller (1940–2019)
 Jenny Holzer (born 1950)
 Greer Honeywill (born 1945)
 Zhang Huan (born 1965)
 Douglas Huebler (1924–1997)
 General Idea
 David Ireland (1930–2009)
 Alfredo Jaar (born 1956)
 Ray Johnson (1927–1995)
 Ronald Jones (1952–2019)
 Ilya Kabakov (born 1933)
 On Kawara (1932–2014)
 Jonathon Keats (born 1971)
 Mary Kelly (born 1941)
 Yves Klein (1928–1962)
 John Knight (artist) (born 1945)
 Joseph Kosuth (born 1945)
 Barbara Kruger (born 1945)
 Yayoi Kusama (born 1929)
 Magali Lara (born 1956)
 John Latham (1921–2006)
 Matthieu Laurette (born 1970)
 Sol LeWitt (1928–2007)
 Annette Lemieux (born 1957)
 Elliott Linwood (born 1956)
 Noah Lyon (born 1979)
 Richard Long (born 1945)
 Mark Lombardi (1951–2000)
 George Maciunas (1931–1978)
 Teresa Margolles (born 1963)
 María Evelia Marmolejo (born 1958) 
 Piero Manzoni (1933–1963)
 Tom Marioni (born 1937)
 Phyllis Mark (1921–2004)
 Danny Matthys (born 1947)
 Allan McCollum (born 1944)
 Cildo Meireles (born 1948)
 Ana Mendieta (born 1985)
 Marta Minujín (born 1943)
 Linda Montano (born 1942)
 Robert Morris (artist) (1931–2018)
 N.E. Thing Co. Ltd. (Iain & Ingrid Baxter) Iain (born 1936) Ingrid (born 1938)
 Maurizio Nannucci (born 1939)
 Bruce Nauman (born 1941)
 Olaf Nicolai (born 1962)
 Margaret Noble (born 1972)
 Yoko Ono (born 1933)
 Roman Opałka (1931–2011)
 Dennis Oppenheim (1938–2011)
 Michele Pred
 Adrian Piper (born 1948)
 William Pope.L (born 1955)
 Liliana Porter (born 1941)
 Dmitri Prigov (1940–2007)
 Guillem Ramos-Poquí (born 1944)
 Charles Recher (1950–2017)
 Jim Ricks (born 1973)
 Ryder Ripps (born 1986)
 Lotty Rosenfeld (1943–2020)
 Martha Rosler (born 1943)
 Allen Ruppersberg (born 1944)
 Santiago Sierra (born 1966)
 Bodo Sperling (born 1952)
 Stelarc (born 1946)
 M. Vänçi Stirnemann (born 1951)
 Hiroshi Sugimoto (born 1948)
 Stephanie Syjuco (born 1974)
 Hakan Topal (born 1972)
 Endre Tot (born 1937)
 David Tremlett (born 1945)
 Tucumán arde (1968)
 Jacek Tylicki (born 1951)
 Mierle Laderman Ukeles (born 1939)
 Wolf Vostell (1932–1998)
 Mark Wallinger (born 1959)
 Gillian Wearing (born 1963)
 Peter Weibel (born 1945)
 Lawrence Weiner (born 1942)
 Roger Welch (born 1946)
 Christopher Williams (born 1956)
 xurban collective
 Industry of the Ordinary
 Arne Quinze (born 1971)

See also

 Anti-art
 Anti-anti-art
 ART/MEDIA
 Body art
 Classificatory disputes about art
 Conceptual architecture
 Contemporary art
 Danger music
 Experiments in Art and Technology
 Found object
 Generative art
 Gutai group
 Happening
 Fluxus
 Information art
 Installation art
 Intermedia
 Land art
 Modern art
 Moscow Conceptualists
 Neo-conceptual art
 Olfactory art
 Post-conceptualism
 Net art
 Postmodern art
 Relational art
 Street installation
 Something Else Press
 Systems art
 Video art
 Visual arts

Individual works

 Fountain
 One and Three Chairs
 The Bride Stripped Bare By Her Bachelors, Even
 Mirror Piece
 Secret Painting
 Victorine

References

Further reading
Books
 Charles Harrison, Essays on Art & Language, MIT Press, 1991
 Charles Harrison, Conceptual Art and Painting: Further essays on Art & Language, MIT press, 2001
 Ermanno Migliorini, Conceptual Art, Florence: 1971
 Klaus Honnef, Concept Art, Cologne: Phaidon, 1972
 Ursula Meyer, ed., Conceptual Art, New York: Dutton, 1972
 Lucy R. Lippard, Six Years: the Dematerialization of the Art Object From 1966 to 1972. 1973. Berkeley: University of California Press, 1997.
 Gregory Battcock, ed., Idea Art: A Critical Anthology, New York: E. P. Dutton, 1973
 Jürgen Schilling, Aktionskunst. Identität von Kunst und Leben? Verlag C.J. Bucher, 1978, .
 Juan Vicente Aliaga & José Miguel G. Cortés, ed., Arte Conceptual Revisado/Conceptual Art Revisited, Valencia: Universidad Politécnica de Valencia, 1990
 Thomas Dreher, Konzeptuelle Kunst in Amerika und England zwischen 1963 und 1976 (Thesis Ludwig-Maximilians-Universität, München), Frankfurt am Main: Peter Lang, 1992
 Robert C. Morgan, Conceptual Art: An American Perspective, Jefferson, NC/London: McFarland, 1994
 Robert C. Morgan, Art into Ideas: Essays on Conceptual Art, Cambridge et al.: Cambridge University Press, 1996
 Charles Harrison and Paul Wood, Art in Theory: 1900–1990, Blackwell Publishing, 1993
 Tony Godfrey, Conceptual Art, London: 1998
 Alexander Alberro & Blake Stimson, ed., Conceptual Art: A Critical Anthology, Cambridge, Massachusetts, London: MIT Press, 1999
 Michael Newman & Jon Bird, ed., Rewriting Conceptual Art, London: Reaktion, 1999
 Anne Rorimer, New Art in the 60s and 70s: Redefining Reality, London: Thames & Hudson, 2001
 Peter Osborne, Conceptual Art (Themes and Movements), Phaidon, 2002  (See also the external links for Robert Smithson)
 Alexander Alberro. Conceptual art and the politics of publicity. MIT Press, 2003.
 Michael Corris, ed., Conceptual Art: Theory, Practice, Myth, Cambridge, England: Cambridge University Press, 2004
 Daniel Marzona, Conceptual Art, Cologne: Taschen, 2005
 John Roberts, The Intangibilities of Form: Skill and Deskilling in Art After the Readymade, London and New York: Verso Books, 2007
 Peter Goldie and Elisabeth Schellekens, Who's afraid of conceptual art?, Abingdon [etc.] : Routledge, 2010. – VIII, 152 p. : ill. ; 20 cm  hbk :   hbk :  pbk :   pbk

Essays
 Andrea Sauchelli, 'The Acquaintance Principle, Aesthetic Judgments, and Conceptual Art, Journal of Aesthetic Education (forthcoming, 2016).

Exhibition catalogues
 Diagram-boxes and Analogue Structures, exh.cat. London: Molton Gallery, 1963.
 January 5–31, 1969, exh.cat., New York: Seth Siegelaub, 1969
 When Attitudes Become Form, exh.cat., Bern: Kunsthalle Bern, 1969
 557,087, exh.cat., Seattle: Seattle Art Museum, 1969
 Konzeption/Conception, exh.cat., Leverkusen: Städt. Museum Leverkusen et al., 1969
 Conceptual Art and Conceptual Aspects, exh.cat., New York: New York Cultural Center, 1970
 Art in the Mind, exh.cat., Oberlin, Ohio: Allen Memorial Art Museum, 1970
 Information, exh.cat., New York: Museum of Modern Art, 1970
 Software, exh.cat., New York: Jewish Museum, 1970
 Situation Concepts, exh.cat., Innsbruck: Forum für aktuelle Kunst, 1971
 Art conceptuel I, exh.cat., Bordeaux: capcMusée d’art contemporain de Bordeaux, 1988
 L'art conceptuel, exh.cat., Paris: ARC–Musée d’Art Moderne de la Ville de Paris, 1989
 Christian Schlatter, ed., Art Conceptuel Formes Conceptuelles/Conceptual Art Conceptual Forms, exh.cat., Paris: Galerie 1900–2000 and Galerie de Poche, 1990
 Reconsidering the Object of Art: 1965–1975, exh.cat., Los Angeles: Museum of Contemporary Art, 1995
 Global Conceptualism: Points of Origin, 1950s–1980s, exh.cat., New York: Queens Museum of Art, 1999
 Open Systems: Rethinking Art c. 1970, exh.cat., London: Tate Modern, 2005
 Art & Language Uncompleted: The Philippe Méaille Collection, MACBA Press, 2014
 Light Years: Conceptual Art and the Photograph 1964–1977, exh.cat., Chicago: Art Institute of Chicago, 2011

External links
 
 
 Art & Language Uncompleted: The Philippe Méaille Collection, MACBA
 Official site of the Château de Montsoreau-Museum of Contemporary Art
 Light Years: Conceptual Art and the Photograph, 1964–1977 at the Art Institute of Chicago
 
 Sol LeWitt, "Paragraphs on Conceptual Art"
 Conceptualism
 pdf file of An Anthology of Chance Operations (1963) containing Henry Flynt's "Concept Art" essay at UbuWeb
 conceptual artists, books on conceptual art and links to further reading
 Arte Conceptual y Posconceptual. La idea como arte: Duchamp, Beuys, Cage y Fluxus – PDF  UCM

 
Art
Contemporary art movements
Visual arts media
Aesthetics
Conceptualism